The 2014 CAF Confederation Cup (also known as the 2014 Orange CAF Confederation Cup for sponsorship reasons) was the 11th edition of the CAF Confederation Cup, Africa's secondary club football competition organized by the Confederation of African Football (CAF). The defending champions CS Sfaxien did not enter the tournament as they qualified for the 2014 CAF Champions League and reached the group stage.

In the final, Al-Ahly of Egypt defeated Séwé Sport of Côte d'Ivoire on the away goals rule after drawing 2–2 on aggregate, to win their first title, and a record-extending 19th overall African title (having already won eight African Champions Cup/CAF Champions League titles, six CAF Super Cup titles and four African Cup Winners' Cup titles). They earned the right to play in the 2015 CAF Super Cup.

Association team allocation
All 56 CAF member associations may enter the CAF Confederation Cup, with the 12 highest ranked associations according to their CAF 5-Year Ranking eligible to enter two teams in the competition. The title holders could also enter if they had not already qualified for the CAF Champions League or CAF Confederation Cup. As a result, theoretically a maximum of 69 teams could enter the tournament (plus eight teams eliminated from the CAF Champions League which enter the play-off round) – although this level has never been reached.

For the 2014 CAF Confederation Cup, the CAF used the 2008–2012 CAF 5-Year Ranking, which calculated points for each entrant association based on their clubs’ performance over those 5 years in the CAF Champions League and CAF Confederation Cup. The criteria for points were the following:

The points were multiplied by a coefficient according to the year as follows:
2012 – 5
2011 – 4
2010 – 3
2009 – 2
2008 – 1

Teams
The following teams entered the competition. Teams in bold received a bye to the first round. The other teams entered the preliminary round.

Associations are shown according to their 2008–2012 CAF 5-Year Ranking – those with a ranking score have their rank and score indicated.

Notes

In addition to the teams above, the following eight teams entered the play-off round.

The following associations did not enter a team:

 Benin
 Cape Verde
 Central African Republic
 Comoros
 Djibouti
 Eritrea
 Lesotho
 Malawi
 Mauritania
 Mauritius
 Réunion
 São Tomé and Príncipe
 Somalia
 Swaziland

Schedule
The schedule of the competition was as follows (all draws held at CAF headquarters in Cairo, Egypt unless otherwise stated).

Qualifying rounds

The draw for the preliminary, first and second qualifying rounds was held on 16 December 2013.

Qualification ties were played on a home-and-away two-legged basis. If the sides were level on aggregate after the second leg, the away goals rule was applied, and if still level, the tie proceeded directly to a penalty shoot-out (no extra time was played).

Preliminary round

|}

Notes

First round

|}

Second round

|}

Play-off round
The draw for the play-off round was held on 1 April 2014. The winners of the Confederation Cup second round were drawn against the losers of the Champions League second round, with the former hosting the second leg.

|}

Group stage

The draw for the group stage was held on 29 April 2014. The eight teams were drawn into two groups of four. Each group was played on a home-and-away round-robin basis. The winners and runners-up of each group advanced to the semi-finals.

Tiebreakers
The teams are ranked according to points (3 points for a win, 1 point for a draw, 0 points for a loss). If tied on points, tiebreakers are applied in the following order:
Number of points obtained in games between the teams concerned
Goal difference in games between the teams concerned
Away goals scored in games between the teams concerned
Goal difference in all games
Goals scored in all games

Group A

Group B

Knock-out stage

Knock-out ties were played on a home-and-away two-legged basis. If the sides were level on aggregate after the second leg, the away goals rule was applied, and if still level, the tie proceeded directly to a penalty shoot-out (no extra time was played).

Bracket

Semi-finals
In the semi-finals, the group A winners played the group B runners-up, and the group B winners played the group A runners-up, with the group winners hosting the second leg.

|}

Final

In the final, the order of legs was decided by a draw, held after the group stage draw.

2–2 on aggregate. Al-Ahly won on the away goals rule.

Top scorers

See also
2014 CAF Champions League
2015 CAF Super Cup

References

External links
Orange CAF Confederation Cup 2014, CAFonline.com

 
2014
2